Bednarek is a Polish surname. Notable people with the surname include:

People 
 Agnieszka Bednarek-Kasza (born 1986), Polish volleyball player
 Elżbieta Bednarek (born 1945), Polish athlete
  (1907–2001), Prisoner-functionary in the Auschwitz concentration camp
 Filip Bednarek, Polish footballer
 Jacek Bednarek (born 1964), Polish racewalker
 Jan Bednarek (born 1996), Polish footballer
 Jan Bednarek (politician) (born 1955), Polish politician
 John Michael Bednarek, US army officer
 Kamil Bednarek (born 1991), Polish reggae vocalist and musician of the band named Bednarek
 Kenneth Bednarek (born 1998), American athlete
 Monika Bednarek (born 1977), German-born Australian linguist
 Robert Bednarek (born 1979), Polish footballer currently playing for Korona Kielce
 Sylwester Bednarek (born 1989), Polish high jumper
 Tomasz Bednarek (born 1981), Polish tennis player

See also 
 
 Bednarski
 Bednář, Czech equivalent of the Polish surname
 Bednárec and Bednáreček, villages in the Jindřichův Hradec district of the Czech Republic
 Bednarskie, village in Gorlice county in southern Poland

Polish-language surnames
Occupational surnames